This is a list of airports in Shanghai, China, including defunct airports and military air bases. , there were two commercial airports, three military and government airports and some rooftop helipads.

Airports

See also
 List of airports in China

Shanghai-related lists
Transport in Shanghai
Shanghai